1st Night is a 2010 opera themed comedy film directed by Christopher Menaul and starring Richard E. Grant, Sarah Brightman, Mia Maestro, and Julian Ovenden.

Plot 
1st Night is about a rich industrialist Adam (Richard E. Grant), who aspires to a more cultured world. Spurred on by playful jibes that he is little more than a city suit living the capitalist's dream, this frustrated amateur opera singer decides to throw an opera (Mozart's Così fan tutte)in his lavish country retreat. Once his friends see him belting out the notes, he feels sure it will spell the end to their shallow taunts. In fact, it might even help him win the hand of Celia (Sarah Brightman), the female conductor he has been pursuing whom - it just so happens - is the first to be recruited for his showpiece.

Cast 
 Mia Maestro as Nicoletta Lampedusa / Fiordiligi
 Stanley Townsend as Paulo Prodi
 Oliver Dimsdale as Philip Ford / Director
 Julian Ovenden as Tom Chambers / Ferrando
 Sarah Brightman as Celia / Conductor
 Jane Howe as Audrey
 Tessa Peake-Jones as Mrs, Hammond
 KLAUS as Baskerville (dog)
 Emma Williams as Tamsin Ford / Dorabella
 Jack Walker as Eric Hammond
 Nigel Lindsay as Martin Mays / Guglielmo
 Richard E. Grant as Sir Adam Drummond / Don Alfonso
 Laura Power as Stella / Stage Manager
 Hugh Ross as Bunny / Costumes
 Andrew Massey as Nathan / Rehearsal Pianist (credited as Andy Massey)
 Susannah Fielding as Debbie Drew / Despina
 Alfie Boe (voice) as Ferrando/Julian Ovenden's singing voice

References

External links 
 

2010 comedy films
2010 films
Films directed by Christopher Menaul